Aeschynite-(Y) (or Aeschinite-(Y), Aeschynite-(Yt), Blomstrandine, Priorite) is a rare earth mineral of yttrium, calcium, iron, thorium, titanium, niobium, oxygen, and hydrogen with the chemical formula .  Its name comes from the Greek word for "shame".  Its Mohs scale rating is 5 to 6.

See also
 List of minerals

References

Mindat.org
Webmineral.org

Lanthanide minerals
Yttrium minerals
Calcium minerals
Iron minerals
Thorium minerals
Titanium minerals
Niobium minerals
Orthorhombic minerals
Minerals in space group 62